VBC may refer to:

 VBC-90, an armoured combat vehicle
 The VBC 88.3 FM, a radio station in Wellington, New Zealand
 Valencia BC, a Spanish basketball team
 Vesper Barge Club, an amateur rowing club in Philadelphia, Pennsylvania
 Victory Base Complex, a large Coalition Forces camp in Baghdad
 Village Building Convergence, a natural building and permaculture gathering
 4-Vinylbenzyl chloride, a chemical compound
 Von Braun Center, an indoor arena in Huntsville, Alabama
 Ventrobasal complex, a portion of the human brain
 Vitale Barberis Canonico, an Italian fabric mill established in 1663
 Vienna BioCenter, a life science research centre